Jack D. Walker (April 5, 1922 – September 1, 2005) was an American politician and physician. He served as the 42nd Lieutenant Governor of Kansas from 1987 to 1991. Walker had previously served as a member of the Kansas Senate from the 8th district and mayor of Overland Park, Kansas.

He is an alumnus of Pittsburg State University and the University of Kansas.

References

1922 births
2005 deaths
Lieutenant Governors of Kansas
American primary care physicians
Pittsburg State University alumni
University of Kansas alumni
20th-century American politicians
People from Girard, Kansas
Republican Party Kansas state senators